Nathaniel Hurd (13 February 1730 – 17 December 1777) is recognized as the first American engraver and a silversmith in Boston, Massachusetts, in the 18th century. He engraved "bookplates ... heraldic devices, seals, ... paper currency, and business cards" along with die engravers  and engravers on copper.

Early life and family 
Hurd's grandfather had come from England and settled in Charlestown. He died in 1749 at the age of 70.

Hurd's father was Jacob Hurd, a leading Boston silversmith, whose works are in the collections of the Peabody Essex Museum, Cleveland Museum of Art, Strawbery Banke Museum, and the Museum of Fine Arts, Boston. Jacob Hurd married a daughter of John Mason (of Kingston, Jamaica who died in 1758).

Career 
An obituary from Amos Doolittle noted Hurd was the first to have engraved copper in the USA.

The lion rampant logo for Phillips Exeter Academy is taken from a bookplate Hurd designed for John Phillips in 1775.

Works

Later life and legacy 
Hurd died on 17 Dec 1777 and is buried in the old Granary Burial Ground in Boston.

Examples of Hurd's work are in the collections of Harvard University; Yale University; Historic Deerfield; the Lexington Historical Society; and the Museum of Fine Arts, Boston.

References

Further reading

Hollis French. Jacob Hurd and his sons Nathaniel & Benjamin, silversmiths, 1702–1781. Walpole Society, 1939.

External links

WorldCat. Hurd, Nathaniel 1730-1777
American Antiquarian Society. Nathaniel Hurd Collection

1730 births
1777 deaths
Artists from Boston
American engravers
18th century in Boston